Almadharasathul Arabiyyathul Islamiyya (Arabiyya School) is the first Arabic Islamic school in the Maldives and educates students from primary to upper secondary grades. It opened on February 8, 1987. The school moved into a new building in 2013.

The school song was introduced in 2016.

Education

There are three steps or groups of grades. Ibthidhaaee is similar to primary school and includes grades one to six. Iudhaadhee is similar to middle school, starting at grade seven and ending at grade nine. The group of students in grades ten to twelve belong to Saanavee, which is similar to secondary school. 
In grade ten, students choose a stream of study. They can pursue the science stream (Ilmee) or the arts stream (Adhabee).

References

Educational institutions established in 1987
Islamic schools
Religious schools in the Maldives
1987 establishments in the Maldives